Darren Wershler, aka Darren Wershler-Henry, (b. 1966) is a Canadian experimental poet, non-fiction writer and cultural critic.

Wershler was the senior editor of Coach House Books between 1997 and 2002, where the works he edited included several highly acclaimed books of contemporary innovative poetry, including Fidget by Kenneth Goldsmith (2000), both volumes of Seven Pages Missing, the collected works of Steve McCaffery (2000, 2002), Lip Service by Bruce Andrews (2001), and Eunoia by Christian Bök (2001).

Wershler is the youngest  poet discussed in Marjorie Perloff's 21st Century Modernism, which analyzes his second book of poetry, the tapeworm foundry (a Trillium Book Award finalist in 2000). He has instructed courses in Communication Studies at York University and Wilfrid Laurier University and currently is the Concordia University Research Chair in Media and Contemporary Literature (Tier 2) at Concordia University. He has authored several books about the Internet, technology and culture, as well as occasional essays on pop culture for newspapers and magazines such as Brick, Broken Pencil and This Magazine.

He lives in Montreal, Quebec.

Works

Poetry
 Update (with Bill Kennedy)
 apostrophe (with Bill Kennedy)
 the tapeworm foundry
 NICHOLODEON: a book of lowerglyphs

Non-fiction
 Guy Maddin's My Winnipeg 
 The Iron Whim: A Fragmented History of Typewriting
 The Original Canadian City Dweller's Almanac (with Hal Niedzviecki)
 FREE as in speech and beer: open source, peer-to-peer and the economics of the online revolution
 CommonSpace: Beyond Virtual Community (with Mark Surman)
 Internet Directory 2001 (with Scott Mitchell)
 The Complete Idiot’s Guide to Online Shopping for Canadians (with Preston Gralla)
 Internet Directory 2000 (with Scott Mitchell)

Articles
 Return From Without: Louis Riel and Liminal Space in Sakolsky, Ron and James Koehnline, Gone to Croatan, Autonomedia, 1993

External links
  dw: Darren Wershler's home page
Records of Darren Wershler-Henry and Kootenay School of Writing fonds are held by Simon Fraser University's Special Collections and Rare Books

20th-century Canadian poets
Canadian male poets
Living people
1966 births
21st-century Canadian poets
Canadian non-fiction writers
Writers from Montreal
Canadian book editors
Anglophone Quebec people
20th-century Canadian male writers
21st-century Canadian male writers
Canadian male non-fiction writers